Olav Anton Thommessen (born 16 May 1946) is a Norwegian contemporary composer who has been one of the foremost modernist composers in Norway since the 1970s. His main compositions include Et glassperlespill and Gjennom Prisme. He was a professor of composition at the Norwegian Academy of Music until retiring in 2014, and has also been an influential figure in music education and music organisations in Norway. Thommessen has played a significant role in aesthetic discourse in Norway and is known for his modernist and atonal stance. In later life he has become known for engaging in a critical public dialogue with his former student Marcus Paus about the future of art music, that has resulted in the opera monologue The Teacher Who Was Not To Be with a libretto by Thommessen; a 2015 debate between the two was described as "the biggest public debate about art music" in Norway since the 1970s.

Background

He is a son of the diplomat Knut Thommessen (né Knut Saenger), a grandson of the German gynecologist Hans Saenger and a great-grandson of the gynecologist Max Saenger (also spelled Sänger). He trained in the United States, earning degrees from Westminster Choir College and Indiana University. He is a former professor of composition at the Norwegian Academy of Music, where he was employed in 1972. He retired in 2014.

Thommessen in aesthetic discourse

Thommessen has also been active in stylistic and aesthetic discourse and is regarded as a critic of non-modernist and tonal music. In addition to public debate, his stance on this matter has also led to compositional output by third parties: a 2006 letter he wrote to the then-26 year old composer Marcus Paus was years later utilized as the libretto for Paus' opera monologue The Teacher Who Was Not To Be, which premiered at the concert "Paus & Paus" (with works by Marcus Paus and Ole Paus) in the Atrium of the University of Oslo as part of Oslo Opera Festival in 2013. Thommessen was later identified by Paus as the previously anonymous librettist. The opera monologue was included on the album Requiem/Trisyn/Læreren som ikke ble (2022) alongside the work Requiem by Marcus and Ole Paus. It was also featured in the first episode of the podcast series Paus og Castle blir kloke på musikklivet (Paus and Castle Figure Out Music Life) in 2021. In the letter/libretto, Thommessen wrote:

In 2015 Thommessen initiated a lengthy debate in the music journal Ballade over Paus' Concerto for Timpani and Orchestra and the merits of the contemporary use of tonal music; it was described as "the biggest public debate about art music" in Norway since the 1970s.

Production

Selected works
  Some Sound for choir and orchestra, op. 8, 1971
 Et Konsert-Kammer, for amplified soprano and antiphonally arranged instrumental groups, 1971
 “Down-Up/Sunpiece” for orchestra, op. 13, 1972–73
 “Mutually” for two voices and instruments, op. 14, 1973
 Stabsarabesk for wind instruments, op. 15, 1974
  The Hermaphrodite , a ballet opera, op. 18, 1970–80
 Stabat mater speciosa for choir, op. 28, 1977
 Banners for Music for choir and orchestra, op. 32, 1978
 Melologer og monodramaer. En ordløs kammeropera, op. 32, no. 2, 1979/82
 The Second Creation. An orchestral drama for trumpets, op. 32 nr. 4, 1988
 A Glass Bead Game op. 34 nr. 2, 1979–82
 Ekko av et ekko op. 36 nr. 2, 1980
  Macrofantasy On Grieg's, 'Piano Concerto in a Minor', op. 39 nr. 1, 1980
 Beyond Neon. Post-commercial Sound Sculptures for horn and symphony orchestra, op. 41 1980
 Through a Prism A Double Concerto for cello, organ and orchestra, op. 44 nr. 1, 1982–83
 EingeBACHt. InnBACHt parafrase over Toccata in G-major, first movement for piano, op. 47 nr. 1, 1984
 L'éclat approchant for synthesizer and chamber orchestra, op. 52 nr. 1, 1986
  The Duchess Dies, op. 56 nr. 1, 1987
 The Phantom of Light. A Miniature Concerto for cello and two wind quintets, op. 62 nr. 1, 1990
 Edda-Da. Monodrama op. 63a, 1991
 Near the Comet Head, op. 64 nr. 4, 1993–94
 Kassandra op. 69, 1996
 Music for Vandals, op. 76, 1998
 Corelli Machine op. 82, 2002
 Veslemøy synsk – en GRIEGsk musi-collage over Arne Garborgs HAUGTUSSA for mezzosopran og klaver, 2007
 Motett over Wergeland (2008)
 Smykke eller saga (2009)
 Kristi Brud (2012) 
 Tuba Mirum (2012)
 The Teacher Who Was Not To Be (2013), librettist (music by Marcus Paus)
 Felix Remix, strykekvartett nr. 4 (2014) 
 A symphonic scherzo for strings and orchestra (2015)
 Purpose: For symphonic wind orchestra (2015)

Discography
 Requiem/Trisyn/Læreren som ikke ble (2022), with The Teacher Who Was Not To Be by Marcus Paus/Thommessen and Requiem by Marcus and Ole Paus
 Bjørn Sagstad, Ila Brass Band, Klang (!) (2012)
 Ernst Simon Glaser, Zvezdochka in orbit (2012)
 Staff Band of the Norwegian Armed Forces, A Tribute to the Northern Winds (2011)
 Veslemøy synsk (2011)
 The Oslo Philharmonic, Peter Herresthal, Bull's Eye ; Please accept my ears ; Cantabile (2006)
 Corelli Machine (2006)
 Einar Henning Smebye, Guri Egge, Songs from the Last Century (2006)
 Christian Eggen, Oslo Sinfonietta, Norges Musikkhistorie - Bind 5 (2001)
 Kyberia, Navigations (2000)
 Peter Herresthal, Partita für Paul 1. sats (1998)
 Peter Herresthal, Please Accept my Ears!  (1998)
 Jeg er flerspors - variasjoner over Olav Anton Thommessen (1998)
 Håkon Austbø, Juni Dahr,  Edda-Da (1995)
 Oslo Sinfonietta (1993)
 Gaute Vikdal, Skygger (1992)
 Frode Thorsen (1991)
 Ensemble K 4 Live at Henie-onstad Art Center (1990)
 Frantisek Veselka, New Norwegian Violin Music, Vol.II (1990)
 Frantisek Veselka, New Norwegian Violin Music, Vol.I (1990)
 The Oslo Philharmonic Orchestra, A Glass bead from above (1990)
 Jeunesses Musicales World Orchestra, Scandinavian Tour 1988  (1988)
 Geir Henning Braaten, Norwegian Pianorama (1984)

References

External links
Olav Anton Thommessen page from Music Information Centre Norway site
Olav Anton Thommessen biography from Music Information Centre Norway site
List of Works supplied by the National Library of Norway

1946 births
Living people
20th-century classical composers
21st-century classical composers
Norwegian classical composers
Norwegian opera composers
Westminster Choir College alumni
Indiana University alumni
Norwegian expatriates in the United States
Academic staff of the Norwegian Academy of Music
Norwegian male classical composers
Librettists
Norwegian people of German descent
20th-century Norwegian male musicians
21st-century Norwegian male musicians